İnstitut is a settlement and municipality in the Samukh Rayon of Azerbaijan. It has a population of 1,946.

References

Populated places in Samukh District